Henry Niño Gómez (born 3 October 1997) is a Nicaraguan professional footballer who plays for Salvadoran club Chalatenango and the Nicaragua national team.

International career
He played for Nicaragua at the 2017 CONCACAF Gold Cup.

International goals
Scores and results list Nicaragua's goal tally first.

References

External links
 

1997 births
Living people
Association football defenders
Nicaraguan men's footballers
Nicaragua international footballers
2017 CONCACAF Gold Cup players
Diriangén FC players
Sportspeople from León, Nicaragua